Ivan Chester Howard (October 12, 1882 – March 30, 1967) was an American professional baseball infielder who played for four seasons in Major League Baseball (MLB). Howard was the younger brother of major leaguer Del Howard. He played for the St. Louis Browns during 1914 and 1915, primarily as a first baseman, after which he was replaced by George Sisler, then was purchased by the Cleveland Indians on February 20, 1916, for whom he played chiefly at second base in the 1916 campaign. His career came to an end with 27 games played in 1917.

He was later the manager of the Oakland Oaks minor league team in the Pacific Coast League from 1923 to 1929.

External links

1882 births
1967 deaths
Major League Baseball infielders
St. Louis Browns players
Cleveland Indians players
Boone Greyhounds players
Omaha Rourkes players
Cedar Rapids Rabbits players
Los Angeles Angels (minor league) players
Portland Beavers players
Oakland Oaks (baseball) managers
Oakland Oaks (baseball) players